Gérard Filippelli (14 December 1942 Paris – 30 March 2021 Argenteuil) was a French actor, composer, and singer.

Biography
In 1964, Filippelli bought an amp from an American soldier in Châteauroux for 500 francs. In 1966, he performed at the Cinéma REX and befriended  and Gérard Rinaldi. He became sound manager in their group. They formed the acting and singing group Les Charlots, where he stayed until 1997. In 1970, his wife died in an automobile accident.

Gérard Filippelli died on 30 March 2021 at the age of 78.

Filmography
 (1970)
Les Bidasses en folie (1971)
Stadium Nuts (1972)
 (1972)
The Big Store (1973)
I Don't Know Much, But I'll Say Everything (1973)
 (1974)
 (1974)
 (1974)
Trop c'est trop (1975)
Bons Baisers de Hong Kong (1975)
 (1979)
 (1980)
 (1983)
 (1984)
 (1992)
Les Charlots Intime (2013)
Les Charlots... Au Phil du temps (2018)

References

1942 births
2021 deaths
Male actors from Paris
French composers
Singers from Paris